The 1904 United States presidential election in Nebraska took place on November 8, 1904. All contemporary 45 states were part of the 1904 United States presidential election. Voters chose eight electors to the Electoral College, which selected the president and vice president.

Nebraska was won by the Republican nominees, incumbent President Theodore Roosevelt of New York and his running mate Charles W. Fairbanks of Indiana. Roosevelt won the state by a margin of 37.94 percentage points.

Results

Results by county

See also
 United States presidential elections in Nebraska

Notes

References

Nebraska
1904
1904 Nebraska elections